Georgia State Route 13 Connector may refer to:

 Georgia State Route 13 Connector (Doraville): a connector route of State Route 13 that exists completely within Doraville
 Georgia State Route 13 Connector (Gainesville): a former connector route of State Route 13 that existed completely within Gainesville
 Georgia State Route 13 Connector (Hall County): a former connector route of State Route 13 that existed south of Gainesville
 Georgia State Route 13 Connector (Stephens County): a former connector route of State Route 13 that existed south of Toccoa

013 Connector